Joseph the Dreamer (translit. Ba'al Hahalomot) is a 1962 stop-motion animated feature film, the first directed by Yoram Gross. It was the first animated film ever made in Israel, and it tells the story of Joseph from the Bible.

Production
The film was produced with home-made puppets from a script by Gross' brother. Part of the budget came from the Israel Film Commission. Gross later recalled:
We had a crew of five people. We receive permission from the municipality to use a storage room as a studio, but in those days the studio lights were so hot that we couldn't film during the day. It was so hot we could only shoot at night, with open windows and doors.

Reception
The film screened at the 1962 Cannes Film Festival under the title Baal Ha Khalomot and competed for the Palme d'Or.

The film was widely seen but was a box office bomb because the majority of the audience were schoolchildren, who only paid a quarter of the normal children's ticket price.

Eleanor Mannikka from The New York Times wrote in her review, "Even with the advanced techniques of a major Hollywood studio -- absent here -- the concept of combining this mode of expression with religious heroes might have been too great a challenge to bring off well. Emphasis lies in the action here, which is still not enough to replace the value of human facial expressions, gestures, and subtle nuances in conveying a needed depth."

It was re-released in Australia in 2002 with English narration by Keith Scott, as well as additional voices by Scott, Jamie Oxenbould and Rachel King.

References

External links

1962 films
1962 animated films
Israeli animated films
Films directed by Yoram Gross
1960s English-language films